Imagination is a compilation album from Dick Haymes released  in 1982.

Tracks 3, 7, 21-26 with the Carmen Dragon Orchestra (recorded in LA, 1949).

Tracks 2, 4-6, 27 with Al Lerner and his Orchestra (recorded in LA 29.09, 1952). 

The CD version includes 14 additional tracks.

Track listing (CD release, CD bonus tracks noted)

 	"Zing! Went The Strings Of My Heart" (James F. Hanley) from the MGM musical film Listen, Darling.
 	"Imagination" (Jimmy Van Heusen / Johnny Burke)
 	"The Object Of My Affection" (Grier/Poe/Tomlin)
 	"It's The Talk Of The Town" (Livingston/Symes/Neilburg)
 	"What's New?" (Bob Haggart / Johnny Burke)
 	"I Could Write A Book" (Richard Rodgers & Lorenz Hart) from the Show Pal Joey
 	"My Blue Heaven" (Walter Donaldson / George A. Whiting)
 	"Music, Maestro, Please!"—on CD release only
 	"I've Got You Under My Skin" (Cole Porter) --  on CD release only
 	"These Foolish Things (Remind Me Of You)" (Harry Link / Jack Strachey / Eric Maschwitz) -- on CD release only
 	"Of All Things"—on CD release only
 	"Where In The World"—on CD release only
 	"Wishing (Will Make It So)"—on CD release only
 	"If I Loved You" (Richard Rodgers &  Oscar Hammerstein II) from the Show Carousel—on CD release only
 	"My Love Loves Me"—on CD release only
 	"Thinking of You"—on CD release only
 	"Sunny Disposish"—on CD release only
 	"But Not For Me" (George Gershwin & Ira Gershwin) from the Show Girl Crazy—on CD release only
 	"Why Can't You Behave? "(Cole Porter) from the Show Kiss Me, Kate—on CD release only
 	"By The Fountain In The Park"—on CD release only
 	"Younger Than Springtime" (Rodgers & Hammerstein) from the Show South Pacific
 	"Bali Ha'i" (Rodgers & Hammerstein) from the Show South Pacific
 	"Some Enchanted Evening" (Rodgers & Hammerstein) from the Show South Pacific
 	"Here In My Arms" (Rodgers & Hart) from the Show Dearest Enemy
 	"Could Be" (Marty Clarke & Bob Haymes)
 	"There's A Small Hotel" (Rodgers & Hart) from the Show On Your Toes
 	"Goodnight, Sweetheart" (Noble/Campbell/Connelly)
 	"I'll See You In My Dreams" (Isham Jones / Gus Kahn) --  on CD release only

References 

1982 compilation albums
Dick Haymes albums